School Administrative Unit 31, or SAU 31 is a school district that serves the Maine towns of Lowell, Burlington, Edinburg, Enfield, Howland, Maxfield, and Passadumkeag. A total of 3 schools are managed in the school district, and there is a total number of 652 students between the 3 schools. The districts total revenue is $7,708,000. The districts total revenue per student is $11,823. Currently, the three schools are in two separate buildings. ESS, the elementary school, is located in West Enfield, while the other two schools are located in Howland.

Penobscot Valley High School

Penobscot Valley High School (PVHS) is a 9–12 school serving approximately 157 students in Howland, Maine. PVHS also employs approximately 28 teachers. PVHS is the only 9-12 school in SAD 31

Hichborn Middle School
Hichborn Middle School, or HMS, was constructed in 1971. HMS currently serves 152 students in the area grades 6-8. 50% of students in the school, are qualified to receive free or reduced lunch. In the summer of 2007, the school underwent a minor renovation, along with the High school. The teachers bathrooms were transformed into one handicap restroom. Some doorways were redone, and the locker room doors were moved. There are plans to renovate the outdated restrooms and locker rooms, which have not been updated since the schools construction in 1971. HMS houses the Jim Currie Library Media Center, an up-to-date library that serves the middle and high school. The middle school has a small gymnasium, commonly referred to as the multi-purpose room. Most PE classes are taken there, with the exception of the High School Gym, when it is unoccupied.

Enfield Station School

"Sited on what was the former Cole Farm, in Enfield, Maine, on land donated by the family of Galen Cole, the Enfield Station School building opened to students in January 1993.

Three district elementary schools (Ring Street in Howland, Curtis School in West Enfield, and the Burlington School in Burlington) closed and all students moved to the new school. Opening with 400 students, the school currently serves a little over 300 students in grades kindergarten through five. Each grade has three classes, with the exception of third grade that has two (classes)."

Budget Problems
On August 24, 2011, new district superintendent Michael Wright, unveiled a public letter indicating that the school had a $1.2 million deficit. This led to severe austerity, including that all new purchases must be made through him, and layoffs of ed. techs and teachers.

References

31
Education in Penobscot County, Maine